Dichomeris intentella is a moth in the family Gelechiidae. It was described by Francis Walker in 1864. It is found in Peru and Amazonas, Brazil.

Adults are gilded ochraceous, the forewings with four irregular purplish bands, the first and third interrupted, the first basal and the second forked in front. The fourth is connected on the interior border with the third. There is a row of black points along the apical part of the costa and along the exterior border.

References

Moths described in 1864
intentella